Cerro Maravilla is Puerto Rico's fourth highest peak at . It is located on the northern edge Barrio Anón in Ponce, close to the border with the municipality Jayuya, and is part of the Cordillera Central (Central Mountain Range). It is known as El Cerro de los Mártires ("Mountain of the Martyrs") and characterized as the most infamous peak in Puerto Rico, due to the 1978 Cerro Maravilla murders which took place here.

Location and access
The peak is located at the end of the 0.5 km-long Puerto Rico Highway 577, which is accessible via Puerto Rico Highway 143, traveling either westbound or eastbound. PR-143 is a secondary two-way, two-lane mountainous road that is relatively well traveled. The peak's coordinates are: .

The height of the mountain makes for some interesting sights. For example, on clear days both the northern and southern coasts of the island can be appreciated simultaneously. In the winter season, the air is crisp and the temperature at night will usually fluctuate between the 40s and 60s degrees Fahrenheit. The chirping of the familiar "coquis" is prominent after nightfall.

Cerro Maravilla incident
The peak might be best known for being the place where two Puerto Rico independence activists were slain on 25 July 1978 in a police ambush (see Cerro Maravilla murders.) This controversy has since turned the mountain into a meeting point for supporters of the independence of the Puerto Rican Commonwealth to gather annually to remember the murdered activists and condemn the current colonial status.

Climate
Cerro Maravilla has a subtropical highland climate (Cfb) under the Köppen climate classification. Although the temperature remains mild year round, night temperatures in winter may reach the mid 40s at times.

See also

 Cerro Maravilla incident

References

Mountains of the Caribbean
Mountains of Puerto Rico
Mountains in Ponce, Puerto Rico
Transmitter sites in Puerto Rico
Jayuya, Puerto Rico
Juana Díaz, Puerto Rico
Ponce, Puerto Rico
Geography of Puerto Rico